Big Beat is the sixth album by American rock band Sparks, released in 1976.

History
Big Beat was recorded at Mediasound Studios, New York City in August 1976. The album was the group's first album after breaking away from their English backing band and returning to America. Instead, the Mael Brothers used session musicians and hired former Milk 'N' Cookies bassist, and Roxy Music contributor (Viva!), Sal Maida on bass, Tuff Darts guitarist Jeffrey Salen and Hilly Boy Michaels on drums. The release was their first for Columbia Records in the US. The album employed a much heavier and harder rock sound. Initially, the Mael brothers had returned to work with the early Sparks member Earle Mankey. Together, they recorded the song "England", a song which bore much in common with the jaunty home-made and unusual sound that the three musicians had made together in the early 1970s. Conversely, Rupert Holmes and Jeffrey Lesser's production on the album was slicker and more direct and the resulting album displayed a more "American" AOR sound. This new "West Coast" sound was deemed a failure as Sparks felt the results were "bereft of personality".

The final track on the album was a re-recording of "I Like Girls". The song had been a live favourite from their pre-1974 days. Versions of the song had previously been recorded in 1973 and again in 1974, but both takes were deemed unsatisfactory. The 1973 recording of "I Like Girls" was later included on the 1991 Rhino Entertainment compilation Profile: The Ultimate Sparks Collection.

The lead single, "Big Boy", and its B-side, "Fill-er-up", were performed for a cameo appearance in the 1976 disaster film Rollercoaster, after Kiss turned down the role.

Release
Big Beat was not a success in terms of chart performance and failed to match the performance of the group's previous three albums. It did not chart in the UK or US.

"Big Boy" and "I Like Girls" were released as singles but neither picked up any significant sales or radio play.

Re-release
Big Beat was reissued by Island in 1994 and remastered in 2006. The first issue by the Island Masters subsidiary added "Tearing The Place Apart" and Russell Mael's "Gone with the Wind", both of which were recorded during the sessions for the Indiscreet album but went unreleased until "The Best of Sparks" compilation LP in 1978. The '21st Century Edition' added the non-album single "I Want to Hold Your Hand", its B-side, "England", and two previously unreleased tracks; "Looks Aren't Everything" and "Intrusion/Confusion". The latter is an early recording of "Confusion". The remastered edition is generally considered sonically superior to the earlier 1994 UK CD and the 1988 Japanese CD but accidentally extends the track "Throw Her Away (And Get A New One)" by about twenty seconds leading to a cold end, rather than the intended fade out present on every other edition.

Track listing

Personnel
 Russell Mael - Vocals
 Ron Mael - Keyboards
 Sal Maida - Bass
 Jeffrey Salen - Guitar
 Hilly Boy Michaels - Drums
Technical
 Rupert Holmes - Production
 Jeffrey Lesser (for Widescreen Productions) - Production
 Godfrey Diamond - Engineering, Re-mix
 Bob Clearmountain - Additional engineering
 Harvey Goldberg - Additional engineering
 Michael Barbiero - Additional engineering
 Richard Avedon - photography

References

External links
 Sparks - The "Big Beat" album files

Sparks (band) albums
1976 albums
Island Records albums
Columbia Records albums